Caulerpa delicatula is a species of seaweed in the Caulerpaceae family.

The seaweed is light green at the base becoming a darker green distally.

It is found along the coast in a large area extending from around the Abrolhos Islands in the Mid West, north through the Gascoyne and into the Pilbara region of Western Australia.

References

delicatula
Species described in 1888